Luite (Estonian for "Dune") is a subdistrict in the district of Kesklinn (Midtown), Tallinn, the capital of Estonia. It has a population of 813.

References

Subdistricts of Tallinn
Kesklinn, Tallinn